Francesco Pianeta (born 8 October 1984) is an Italian former professional boxer who competed from 2005 to 2018. He challenged for the unified WBA (Super), IBF, WBO and The Ring heavyweight championship in 2013 and the WBA (Regular) title in 2015. At regional level, he held the European Union heavyweight title from 2008 to 2009.

Background
Pianeta was born in Corigliano in the province of Cosenza. When he was six his family emigrated to Germany and his father went to work in a butcher store.

Before he turned to professional boxing Pianeta practiced Muay Thai and had a record of 9 wins and one loss.

Despite being a long-time Germany resident, Pianeta has held close ties with Italy and in 2008 he stated that his ambition was to win the Italian heavyweight title.

Professional career
Pianeta's first fight as a professional boxer was in July 2005, in Hessen, Germany, when he beat Slovakian journeyman Sylvester Petrovic with a second round knockout.

Pianeta was subsequently undefeated in all of his next 27 fights, with 14 wins by KO and 1 draw. 

On May 4, 2013, Pianeta fought Wladimir Klitschko for WBA (Super), IBF, WBO, IBO, lineal & The Ring heavyweight titles. He was knocked down 3 times by Klitschko and lost the bout by the way of TKO.

Up until 2018, Pianeta was trained by Alexander Petkovic and promoted by Petkovic′s Petko′s LMS Promotion. Based in Germany, he has also fought in Italy, Ireland, Austria, Poland and Belgium. 

Pianeta's final fight was against former unified and lineal heavyweight champion Tyson Fury at Windsor Park on August 18, 2018. Fury dominated the fight in convincing fashion, winning every single round on referee Steve Gray's scorecard in a shutout points decision victory, handing Pianeta his fifth career loss.

In February 2019, Pianeta announced his retirement. He is now a boxing trainer.

Professional boxing record

References

External links
Francesco Pianeta - Official website 
 

1984 births
Living people
Heavyweight boxers
Italian male boxers
People from Corigliano Calabro
Sportspeople from the Province of Cosenza